DeAndre Cortez "Pedro" Bradshaw (born October 14, 1998) is an American professional basketball player for the Fort Wayne Mad Ants of the NBA G League. He played college basketball for the Eastern Kentucky Colonels and the Bellarmine Knights.

Early life and high school career
Bradshaw attended Russellville High School in Russellville, Kentucky. He averaged 21.1 points and 12.2 rebounds per game as a junior. As a senior, he averaged 22.1 points and 13.1 rebounds per game, leading the team to the Region 4 Tournament championship game. Bradshaw earned co-Region 4 Player of the Year honors. He was a finalist for Kentucky Mr. Basketball and finished his career with 1,938 points and 1,169 rebounds, both school records. Bradshaw committed to playing college basketball for Belmont, choosing the Bruins over Eastern Kentucky, Long Beach State and UNC Wilmington.

College career
Bradshaw was urged to take a redshirt year by Belmont coach Rick Byrd, but he declined. Bradshaw opted to transfer to Eastern Kentucky in December 2017, after not seeing playing time in nine games. He sat out a season and was eligible at the semester break in 2018. Bradshaw averaged 2.4 points and 1.8 rebounds per game as a sophomore at Eastern Kentucky, and entered the transfer portal after the season. He ended up coming to Division II program Bellarmine and had immediate eligibility. Bradshaw averaged 9.2 points per game, helping the Knights finish 20–8. As a senior, he averaged 16 points per game and 6.9 rebounds per game as Bellarmine transitioned to Division I. Bradshaw was named to the First Team All-ASUN. Following the season, he declared for the 2021 NBA draft.

Professional career

Salt Lake City Stars (2021)
Bradshaw was selected with the 10th pick of the second round of the 2021 NBA G League draft by the Salt Lake City Stars. On November 7, 2021, he scored 23 points against the Oklahoma City Blue. Bradshaw averaged 8.3 points, 2.8 rebounds and 1.3 assists per game, but was waived in December 2021.

Sioux Falls Skyforce (2021–2022)
On December 6, he signed with the Sioux Falls Skyforce. He was later waived on January 13, 2022.

Iowa Wolves (2022)
On January 16, 2022, Bradshaw was acquired via available player pool by the Iowa Wolves.  He was waived on January 31, after appearing in three games averaging 1.7 points and 3.5 rebounds per game. Bradshaw was re-acquired on February 14, but waived again on February 19.

Fort Wayne Mad Ants (2022–present)
On February 21, 2022, Bradshaw was acquired via available player pool by the Fort Wayne Mad Ants.

Career statistics

College

NCAA Division I

|-
| style="text-align:left;"| 2017–18
| style="text-align:left;"| Belmont
| style="text-align:center;" colspan="11"|  Redshirt
|-
| style="text-align:left;"| 2018–19
| style="text-align:left;"| Eastern Kentucky
| 10 || 1 || 7.3 || .417 || .167 || .600 || 1.8 || .4 || .6 || .2 || 2.4
|-
| style="text-align:left;"| 2020–21
| style="text-align:left;"| Bellarmine
| 22 || 22 || 29.4 || .500 || .360 || .835 || 6.9 || 2.5 || 1.6 || .5 || 16.0
|- class="sortbottom"
| style="text-align:center;" colspan="2"| Career
| 32 || 23 || 22.5 || .492 || .339 || .825 || 5.3 || 1.8 || 1.3 || .4 || 11.7

NCAA Division II

|-
| style="text-align:left;"| 2019–20
| style="text-align:left;"| Bellarmine
| 28 || 24 || 22.6 || .545 || .421 || .800 || 5.3 || 1.9 || 1.0 || .5 || 9.2

References

External links
Bellarmine Knights bio
Eastern Kentucky Colonels bio

1998 births
Living people
American men's basketball players
Basketball players from Kentucky
Bellarmine Knights men's basketball players
Eastern Kentucky Colonels men's basketball players
Fort Wayne Mad Ants players
Iowa Wolves players
People from Russellville, Kentucky
Salt Lake City Stars players
Shooting guards
Sioux Falls Skyforce players